William Howell may refer to:

Bill Howell (cricketer) (1869–1940), Australian cricketer
William Howell (cricketer, born 1902) (1902–1987), Australian cricketer
William Howell (cricketer, born 1883) (1883–1960), New Zealand cricketer 
William Howell (Barbadian cricketer) (1866-1958), Barbadian cricketer
William Devin Howell (born 1970), American serial killer
William G. Howell (born 1971), American political scientist
William Henry Howell (1860–1945), American physiologist
William J. Howell (born 1943), American politician
William R. Howell, former chairman and CEO of J.C. Penney Company, Inc
William Roe Howell (1846–1890), New York City photographer
William Thompson Howell (1810–1870), American jurist and politician
William Tudor Howell, British Conservative politician, MP for Denbigh Boroughs
William Terry Howell, for whom a Liberty ship was named
William Howell (rugby union) (1863–?), Welsh rugby union player
William D. Howell (1797–1836), American surgeon who died as a defender of the Alamo
William Barberie Howell (1865–1927), judge for the United States Customs Court

See also
Bill Howell (disambiguation)
William Howells (disambiguation)